Allan Whitwell (born 5 May 1954) is a male former rower who competed for Great Britain and England.

Rowing career
Whitwell was born in 1954 in York, Yorkshire. He was a member of the silver medal-winning British coxed eight at the 1980 Moscow Olympics. He competed in three Olympic Games in total, appearing in the 1976 Summer Olympics and 1984 Summer Olympics in addition to his medal winning 1980 Games.

In 1977 he was part of the eight that reached the final and finished 5th, at the 1977 World Rowing Championships in Amsterdam. In 1986, he was in the World Championship winning in the lightweight double sculls with Carl Smith. He came third teamed with Smith in the 1987 World Rowing Championships in the same boat class. He represented England and won a bronze medal in the double sculls, at the 1986 Commonwealth Games in Edinburgh, Scotland.

Personal life
He is currently running an international sculling camp for scullers of any level from novice to international. He also teaches at a school for children with special needs.

References

External links
 
 

Olympic rowers of Great Britain
Olympic silver medallists for Great Britain
Rowers at the 1976 Summer Olympics
Rowers at the 1980 Summer Olympics
Rowers at the 1984 Summer Olympics
1954 births
Living people
Sportspeople from York
Olympic medalists in rowing
English male rowers
Medalists at the 1980 Summer Olympics
Commonwealth Games medallists in rowing
Commonwealth Games bronze medallists for England
World Rowing Championships medalists for Great Britain
Rowers at the 1986 Commonwealth Games
Medallists at the 1986 Commonwealth Games